The World's Largest Cedar Bucket is a  red cedar bucket in Murfreesboro, Tennessee.

History
The bucket was built in 1887 by the Tennessee Red Cedar Woodenworks Company from Murfreesboro, Tennessee. It was originally displayed in Murfreesboro, until it was displayed at the 1893 Chicago World's Fair and the 1904 Saint Louis World's Fair. The cedar bucket factory burned down in 1952, and local grocer Crigger’s Market bought the item to display it. It was auctioned off in approximately 1965 and it was purchased by a Rossville, Georgia amusement park. It was returned to Murfreesboro in 1976 to be displayed at Cannonsburgh Village.

Arson
On June 19, 2005, the bucket was burned by arsonists. The fire was put out before any adjacent buildings were burned down. Roadside America described the condition of the bucket as "Severely damaged, the bucket is now blackened and splintered charcoal shards held together by metal bands."

Rebuilding
On October 22nd, 2011, a refurbished bucket was unveiled at the 35th annual Harvest Days Festival in Cannonsburgh Pioneer Village.  In a partnership between Roy Haney’s sawmill in Cannon County and the Rutherford County Blacksmiths’ Association, high quality, rare red cedar was collected to restore the bucket to its former glory.

References

Containers
Murfreesboro, Tennessee
Buildings and structures in Rutherford County, Tennessee
Roadside attractions in Tennessee
1887 establishments in Tennessee